= Yaft Abad =

Neighbourhood in Tehran, Iran

- Neighbourhood
- Interactive map of Yaft Abad
- Country: Iran
- City: Tehran

Yaft Abad (Persian: یافت‌آباد, Old Persian: Yāftegān) is a neighbourhood in Tehran, located south-west of the central district of Tehran in Iran. Yāftegān is in the middle of "Ferdos Locality".

This area is famous for having one of the largest furniture markets in Iran (Yaftabad Furniture Market).
